Cyperus chrysocephalus is a species of sedge that is native to parts of Africa.

See also 
 List of Cyperus species

References 

chrysocephalus
Plants described in 1921
Flora of Tanzania
Flora of Malawi
Flora of Burundi
Flora of Angola
Flora of Guatemala
Flora of Zambia
Flora of the Republic of the Congo
Taxa named by Georg Kükenthal